Henry Theophilus Howaniec (14 February 1931 – 30 March 2018) was a Roman Catholic bishop.

Howaniec was born in Chicago, Illinois and ordained to the priesthood, in West Chicago, Illinois on June 14, 1956, for the Franciscan Fathers of the Assumption. He was ordained a bishop on November 26, 2000, and then served as bishop of the Catholic Diocese of Most Holy Trinity in Almaty, Kazakhstan until 2011. Howaniec died in Milwaukee, Wisconsin.

Notes

1931 births
2018 deaths
Clergy from Chicago
American Roman Catholic priests
Kazakhstani Roman Catholic bishops
Catholics from Illinois